Hapoel Haifa Football Club is an Israeli football club located in Haifa. During the 2021–22 campaignthe club have competed in the Israeli Premier League, State Cup and Toto Cup.

Club

Kits

 Provider: Diadora
 Main Sponsor: Almog
 Secondary Sponsor:  Shorashim

First team

Transfers

Summer

In:

Out:

Winter

In:

Out:

Pre-season and friendlies

Competitions

Overview

Ligat Ha'Al

Regular season

Results summary

Results by matchday

Matches

Results overview

Play-off

Relegation round table

Results overview

State Cup

Round of 32

Round of 16

Quarter final

Semi final

Toto Cup

Group stage

Semi-final

Statistics

Appearances and goals

|-
|colspan="12"|Players who appeared for Hapoel Haifa that left during the season:
|-

|-
|}

Goalscorers

Last updated: 12 May 2019

Assists

Last updated: 12 May 2019

Clean sheets

Updated on 12 May 2019

Disciplinary record

Updated on 12 May 2019

Suspensions

Updated on 12 May 2019

Penalties

Updated on 12 May 2019

Overall

{|class="wikitable" style="text-align: center;"
|-
!
!Total
!Home
!Away
!Natural
|-
|align=left| Games played          || 43 || 21 || 21 || 1
|-
|align=left| Games won             || 14 || 8 || 6 || 0
|- 
|align=left| Games drawn           || 12 || 6 || 6 || 0
|-
|align=left| Games lost             || 16 || 7 || 9 || 1
|-
|align=left| Biggest win             || 5–1  Beitar Jerusalem || 5–1  Beitar Jerusalem || 3–1  F.C. Ashdod || 
|-
|align=left| Biggest loss       || 1–5  Maccabi Haifa || 1–3  Maccabi Tel Aviv || 1–5  Maccabi Haifa || 0–2  Maccabi Haifa
|-
|align=left| Biggest win (League)    || 5–1  Beitar Jerusalem || 5–1  Beitar Jerusalem || 3–1  F.C. Ashdod || 
|-
|align=left| Biggest loss (League)   || 1–5  Maccabi Haifa || 1–3  Maccabi Tel Aviv || 1–5  Maccabi Haifa || 
|-
|align=left| Biggest win (Cup)    || 1–0  Bnei Yehuda Tel Aviv1–0  Bnei Yehuda Tel Aviv || 1–0  Bnei Yehuda Tel Aviv || 1–0  Bnei Yehuda Tel Aviv || 
|-
|align=left| Biggest loss (Cup)     ||  ||  ||  || 0–2  Maccabi Haifa
|-
|align=left| Biggest win (Toto)    || 3–2  Bnei Sakhnin || 1–0  Hapoel Ironi Kiryat Shmona || 3–2  Bnei Sakhnin || 
|-
|align=left| Biggest loss (Toto)   ||  ||  ||  || 
|-
|align=left| Goals scored           || 46 || 26 || 20 || 0
|-
|align=left| Goals conceded         || 54 || 22 || 30 || 2
|-
|align=left| Goal difference        || -8 || 4 || -10 || -2
|-
|align=left| Clean sheets            || 12 || 6 || 6 || 0
|-
|--
|-
|align=left| Yellow cards          || 96 || 45 || 50 || 1
|-
|align=left| Red cards               || 4 || 2 || 1 || 1
|-
|align=left| Most appearances      ||colspan=4|  Dudu Twito (41)
|-
|align=left| Most goals        ||colspan=4|  Alon Turgeman (14)
|-
|align=left| Most Assist        ||colspan=4|  Liran Serdal,  Hanan Maman (7)
|-
|align=left| Penalties for   || 2 || 2 ||  || 
|-
|align=left| Penalties against   || 4 || 1 || 3 || 
|-
|align=left| Winning rate         || % || % || % || %
|-

References

Hapoel Haifa F.C. seasons
Hapoel Haifa